"Changing Nature" is the seventh episode of the fourth season of the ABC sitcom Dinosaurs as well as the final episode of the series before its apparent cancellation. It originally aired on ABC on July 20, 1994, as the network series finale. The episode had an unexpectedly dark and depressing tone, which caught a lot of fans and critics off-guard.

The final episode deals with nature being thrown out of balance due to the extinction of a bug species called Bunch Beetles caused by the corrupt company WESAYSO, whom the main character of the series, Earl Sinclair works for. To fix the problem WESAYSO has formed a task force with Earl as chairman in charge of the task force. However, after multiple attempts to fix the problem, Earl only winds up making the problem worse and causes the Ice Age.

Plot 
The Sinclair family is celebrating the upcoming arrival of the Bunch Beetles, a species of insect who come to Pangaea annually to eat all the cider poppies which tend to grow excessively around spring. However, after the countdown, the Beetles don't return, much to the confusion of everyone. Four days later, without the Bunch Beetles, the cider poppies have completely grown out of control and are overtaking Pangaea.

As the Sinclairs and Earl's best friend, Roy, try to deal with the situation by trimming down the cider poppies, one of the Bunch Beetles, Stan, unexpectedly arrives at the Sinclair's house. He explains that he became lost on his way to the mating ground, but he needs to get there now since Bunch Beetles have a short lifespan. Charlene volunteers to help Stan, but when they get to the swamp, they discover that FruitCo, a subsidiary of the WESAYSO corporation, has built a wax fruit factory over the mating ground and the Bunch Beetles who arrived at the factory have been sprayed with insecticide, causing the entire species to become extinct, thus making Stan the last of his kind.

Charlene reports the extinction of the Bunch Beetles on DNN (Dinosaur News Network) and even points out how the WESAYSO corporation is also responsible for the cider poppy crisis, but Earl takes over the interview and tries to defend the company's actions by claiming that it was all in the name of progress. Intrigued by the interview, B.P. Richfield decides to have Earl be in charge of the task force.

When Earl and Roy are being interviewed about the task force, they explain that they're going to spray the cider poppies with defoliant and assures reporters that it is safe, even though it was donated to them by B.P. Richfield who prefers to remain anonymous. Robbie questions Earl about spraying the continent with poison and asks if there is a safer alternative. Charlene suggests that they trim back the vines and try to live with them for a while until nature restores the balance, but Earl refuses, claiming it will take too long. The defoliant is sprayed, which gets rid of the cider poppies, but the next day it is revealed that all plant life on Pangea has been killed, resulting in a famine. Earl then reassures his family that Mr. Richfield has found a way to bring back the plants.

In Richfield's office, he, Earl, and Roy try to figure out how to revive the plants. Richfield states that they have to make it rain and in order to do so, they need clouds, which he thinks come from volcanoes (which actually produce smoke). Richfield states that in order to make clouds they need to set off a bunch of volcanoes by dropping bombs in them. Earl is reluctant since their last idea backfired, but is convinced by Richfield not to lose faith in progress and they all go with the plan.

Soon, bombs are dropped into volcanoes all around the world, which create giant thick black clouds that cover the entire planet. Earl thinks the clouds will create rain, but the rest of the Sinclair family disagrees. On the news, Howard Handupme reports that the clouds are blocking off the sun and causing global temperatures to drop precipitously. Earl tries to stay positive, claiming that the sun will come out and melt the snow, making the plants grow. But Handupme reports that due to the thickness of the clouds scientists have predicted that it will be tens of thousands of years before the sun shines over Pangaea again, thus creating the Ice Age. Earl calls Mr. Richfield about the problem, but Richfield refuses to listen, claiming it's good because everyone is panic buying WESAYSO's products.

Later, Earl apologizes to Stan for the destruction of his mating ground and the extinction of his species. Earl then apologizes to his family for his unintentional part in his company's bringing the end of the world and that he put too much faith in progress and technology and not having any respect for nature. Baby asks if they're gonna move but Earl replies that they cannot because there's no place to move to. Robbie and Charlene assure Baby that whatever happens, they'll all stay together as a family. Earl also reassures them that they will survive, stating "dinosaurs have been on Earth for 150 million years and it's not like we're going to just... disappear!" However, the Sinclairs look on in uncertainty as snow continues to slowly bury their home and the wax fruit factory.

After taking a look at the long-range forecast, Handupme signs off for the last time by saying "Goodbye" to the viewers, ending the series on a somber note.

Reception

Response 
Stuart Pankin the voice of Earl, stated that the ending "was a simplistic and heartfelt social comment, yet it was very powerful" with "subtlety" being a defining aspect.

The television series creators decided to make this finale as a way of ending the series as they knew the show would be canceled when they created season 4. Michael Jacobs said, "We certainly wanted to make the episode to be educational to the audience", and as people knew dinosaurs were no longer alive, "the show would end by completing the metaphor and showing that extinction." Ted Harbert, president of ABC, expressed discomfort at the ending in a telephone call but allowed it to go forward.

Jacobs stated that correspondence from parents revealed that "they understood the creativity in the final episode, and they were sad at the predicament we presented in the story." Pankin said, "Everybody was at first shocked, but I think it was more of a reaction to the show ending." Pankin stated that they "understood the creativity in the final episode, and they were sad at the predicament we presented in the story." He did not remember a significant number of audience members being angry about the ending. In 2018 Jacobs said that the episode would have trended on social media had it been released that year. 

Noel Murray of The A.V. Club stated that the episode "delivered as blunt an environmental message as any major network TV broadcast since The Lorax." Brian Galindo of BuzzFeed described it as being shocking for children.

Timothy Donohoo of CBR stated that "The show's climate change-oriented ending is also more topical than ever, as concerns over the opposite continue to bring into question humanity's carbon footprint." Donohoo also stated that "Dinosaurs became TV's most shocking finale precisely because it opted not for some moderately funny ending joke, but to subvert all expectations by advancing an important message through the protagonists' house, and their world at large, being engulfed in a fatal freeze."

Awards and nominations

Footnotes

References

1994 American television episodes
American television series finales
Apocalyptic television episodes
Television episodes about dinosaurs
Television episodes about families
Television episodes about insects
Fictional beetles
Television episodes about death
Works about suburbs
Television episodes set in prehistory